X Factor Indonesia is an Indonesian television music competition to find new singing talent; the winner of which receives a 1 billion rupiahs, cars, motorcycles and recording contract with Hits Records. The third season aired on 13 December 2021 and is produced by RCTI in-house production and Fremantle Indonesia. Robby Purba resumes his role as the host of the show alongside returning judges Rossa, while Afgan, Ahmad Dhani and Bebi Romeo is replaced by Anang Hermansyah, Bunga Citra Lestari, Ariel "Noah" and Judika.

The competition was won by 24-year-old Alvin Jonathan, and Bunga Citra Lestari emerged as the winning mentor for the first time. It's also the first time in history for a contestant from the "Boys" category to win the show. This season was also making the history, due to Rossa, who was the two time X Factor Indonesia winning mentor, and also mentor of this season's Girls category failed for the hattrick winning, after Maysha Jhuan's elimination in the Grand Final.

Judges and hosts
Robby Purba was the first cast member confirmed to return for the third season in July 2021 based on his Instagram post. Later, it was officially announced in X Factor Indonesia's official social media as same as 35th Robby's birthday date at July 25, 2021.

At October 19, 2021 a spoiler video showed at social media that Rossa return for her third season, with another new judges such as Anang Hermansyah, Ariel "Noah", Bunga Citra Lestari, and Judika. Later, it was officially announced in X Factor Indonesia's official social media at November 5, 2021.

Selection process

Auditions 

The online auditions divided into three phases. First phase began on July 14–August 15, 2021, second phase began on September 6–19, 2021 and third phase began on October 11–31, 2021 at RCTI+, Facebook, Instagram and Facebook Messenger platform. The online auditions also held at TikTok platform. This season only held online auditions and no held direct auditions in any city because of COVID-19 pandemic.

The contestants who passed online audition were later invited to the last set of auditions in Jakarta. These auditions individually occur simultaneously before the judges; and with no audience in studio to keep COVID-19 safety protocols. The auditions were broadcast on December 13-14 and 20-21 episodes.

Bootcamp 

The 30 successful acts were:
Boys: Jeremia Frans, Alvin Jonathan, Iyan Joshua, Edo Pratama, Tyok Satrio, Danar Widianto
Girls: Sonya Bara, Jessica Emmanuella, Nada Fidarensa, Maysha Jhuan, Putu Maydea, Marcella Nursalim
Males: Abdurrachman, Roby Gultom, Andi Gunawan, Hendra Nurrahman, Daniel Pattinama, Akshin Zaidi
Females: Intan Ayu, Ruth Nelly, Mary Rumintjap, Elfa Tahmila, Nadhira Ulya, Saly Yuniar
Groups: 2nd Chance, For-X, GeryGany, The Gon's, Twister, Whiz

Judges' home visits

Contestants 

The top 15 contestants were confirmed as follows;

Key:
 – Winner
 – Runner-up
 – Third place

Gala live shows

The Gala live shows began on January 17, 2022.

Result summary 
Colour key
 Act in team BCL

 Act in team Ariel

 Act in team Anang

 Act in team Rossa

 Act in team Judika 

 Contestant was in the bottom two/three and had to sing again in the Save Me Song

 Contestant received the fewest public votes but safe from elimination (no Save Me Song)

 Contestant received the most public votes

 Contestant received the fewest public votes and was immediately eliminated (no Save Me Song)

 Contestant won 3rd place

 Contestant won 2nd place

 Contestant won 1st place

 The most multi 1st place on public vote

 Maia Estianty cast Anang Hermansyah's vote in her absence.
 Ariel Noah was not required to vote as there was already a majority.
 Maia Estianty cast Anang Hermansyah's vote in her absence.
 Judika was not required to vote as there was already a majority.
 Judika was not required to vote as there was already a majority.
 Armand Maulana cast Judika's vote in his absence.

Gala live show details

Week 1 (January 17)
Theme: Contestant's Choice
 

Anang Hermansyah was absent for the first gala live show due to being in quarantine. Therefore, Maia Estianty filled in as her replacement.

Judges' decisions to save
Rossa: Marcella Nursalim - Backed her own act
Estianty: Nadhira Elya - Backed one of Anang's acts and based it on the Save Me Song performance
Judika: Nadhira Elya - Gave no reason
BCL: Nadhira Elya - Gave no reason
Ariel Noah was not required to vote as there was already a majority.

Week 2 (January 24)
Theme: Top Hits songs
 

Anang Hermansyah was absent for the second gala live show due to being in quarantine. Therefore, Maia Estianty filled in as her replacement.

Judges' decisions to save
Judika: Abdurrachman
Rossa: Whiz
Ariel Noah: Whiz
BCL: Abdurrachman
Estianty: Abdurrachman

Week 3 (January 31)
Theme: Viewers Challenge
 

Judges' decisions to save
Anang: Nadhira Ulya
BCL: Edo Pratama
Ariel Noah: Nadhira Ulya
Rossa: Nadhira Ulya
Judika was not required to vote as there was already a majority.

Week 4 (February 7)
Theme: Love songs
 

Judges' decisions to save
Anang: Hendra Nurrahman
Ariel Noah: Hendra Nurrahman
BCL: Abdurrachman
Rossa: Hendra Nurrahman
Judika was not required to vote as there was already a majority.

Week 5 (February 14)
Theme: 
 

Judika was absent for the fifth gala live show. Therefore, Armand Maulana filled in as his replacement.

Judges' decisions to save
Anang: Nadhira Ulya
Maulana: Hendra Nurrahman
Ariel Noah: Nadhira Ulya
BCL: Hendra Nurrahman
Rossa: Hendra Nurrahman

References

External links
 Official website

Indonesia 03
Season 3
2021 Indonesian television seasons
2022 Indonesian television seasons